Elaeagnus , silverberry or oleaster, is a genus of about 50–70 species of flowering plants in the family Elaeagnaceae.

Description 
Elaeagnus plants are deciduous or evergreen shrubs or small trees. The alternate leaves and the shoots are usually covered with tiny silvery to brownish scales, giving the plants a whitish to grey-brown colour from a distance. The flowers are small, with a four-lobed calyx and no petals; they are often fragrant. The fruit is a fleshy drupe containing a single seed; it is edible in many species. Several species are cultivated for their fruit, including E. angustifolia, E. umbellata, and E. multiflora (gumi).  E. umbellata contains the carotenoid lycopene.

Taxonomy
The genus Elaeagnus was erected in 1754 by Carl Linnaeus, who attributed the name to Joseph Pitton de Tournefort. There is agreement that the name is based on Theophrastus's use of the Ancient Greek  (latinized to ) as the name of a shrub.

Species 
Elaeagnus comprises the following species:

 Elaeagnus angustata (Rehder) C.Y.Chang (China)
 Elaeagnus angustifolia L. – oleaster, Russian silverberry, or Russian olive (western Asia)
 Elaeagnus annamensis S.Moore
 Elaeagnus argyi H.Lév. (China)
 Elaeagnus bambusetorum Hand.-Mazz. (China)
 Elaeagnus bockii Diels (China)
 Elaeagnus bonii Lecomte
 Elaeagnus calcarea Z.R.Xu
 Elaeagnus caudata Schltdl. ex Momiy.
 Elaeagnus cinnamomifolia W.K.Hu & H.F.Chow (China)
 Elaeagnus commutata Bernh. ex Rydb. – American silverberry or wolf-willow (North America)
 Elaeagnus conferta Roxb. (southern Asia)
 Elaeagnus courtoisii Belval (China)
 Elaeagnus davidii Franch. (China)
 Elaeagnus delavayi Lecomte (China)
 Elaeagnus difficilis Servett. (China)
 Elaeagnus epitricha Momiy. ex H.Ohba
 Elaeagnus fasciculata Griff.
 Elaeagnus formosana Nakai (Taiwan)
 Elaeagnus formosensis Hatus.
 Elaeagnus geniculata D.Fang
 Elaeagnus glabra Thunb. (eastern Asia)
 Elaeagnus gonyanthes Benth. (China)
 Elaeagnus griffithii Servett. (China)
 Elaeagnus grijsii Hance (China)
 Elaeagnus guizhouensis C.Y.Chang (China)
 Elaeagnus henryi Warb. ex Diels (China)
 Elaeagnus heterophylla D.Fang & D.R.Liang
 Elaeagnus hunanensis C.J.Qi & Q.Z.Lin
 Elaeagnus indica Servett.
 Elaeagnus infundibularis Momiy.
 Elaeagnus jiangxiensis C.Y.Chang (China)
 Elaeagnus jingdonensis C.Y.Chang (China)
 Elaeagnus kanaii Momiy. (China)
 Elaeagnus lanceolata Warb. (China)
 Elaeagnus lanpingensis C.Y.Chang (China)
 Elaeagnus laosensis Lecomte
 Elaeagnus latifolia L. (southern Asia)
 Elaeagnus lipoensis Z.R.Xu
 Elaeagnus liuzhouensis C.Y.Chang (China)
 Elaeagnus longiloba C.Y.Chang (China)
 Elaeagnus loureiroi Champ. (southern China)
 Elaeagnus luoxiangensis C.Y.Chang (China)
 Elaeagnus luxiensis C.Y.Chang (China)
 Elaeagnus macrantha Rehder (China)
 Elaeagnus macrophylla Thunb. (eastern Asia)
 Elaeagnus magna (Servett.) Rehder (China)
 Elaeagnus matsunoana Makino
 Elaeagnus maximowiczii Servett.
 Elaeagnus micrantha C.Y.Chang (China)
 Elaeagnus mollis Diels (China)
 Elaeagnus montana Makino
 Elaeagnus morrisonensis Hayata (Taiwan)
 Elaeagnus multiflora Thunb. – cherry silverberry or gumi (eastern Asia)
 Elaeagnus murakamiana Makino
 Elaeagnus nanchuanensis C.Y.Chang (China)
 Elaeagnus obovata H.L.Li (China)
 Elaeagnus obovatifolia D.Fang
 Elaeagnus obtusa C.Y.Chang (China)
 Elaeagnus oldhamii Maxim. (China)
 Elaeagnus ovata Servett. (China)
 Elaeagnus pallidiflora C.Y.Chang (China)
 Elaeagnus parvifolia Wall. ex Royle (central Asia)
 Elaeagnus pilostyla C.Y.Chang (China)
 Elaeagnus pingnanensis C.Y.Chang (China)
 Elaeagnus pungens Thunb. – silverthorn (Japan)
 Elaeagnus pyriformis Hook.f. (eastern Himalaya)
 Elaeagnus retrostyla C.Y.Chang (China)
 Elaeagnus rhamnoides (L.) A.Nelson
 Elaeagnus rivularis Merr.
 Elaeagnus rotundata Nakai
 Elaeagnus sarmentosa Rehder (China)
 Elaeagnus schlechtendalii Servett. (China)
 Elaeagnus songarica Schltr.
 Elaeagnus s-stylata Z.R.Xu
 Elaeagnus stellipila Rehder (China)
 Elaeagnus takeshitai Makino
 Elaeagnus taliensis C.Y.Chang (China)
 Elaeagnus tarokoensis S.Y.Lu & Yuen P.Yang
 Elaeagnus thunbergii Servett. (China)
 Elaeagnus tonkinensis Servett. (southeastern Asia)
 Elaeagnus tricholepis Momiy.
 Elaeagnus triflora Roxb. (southeastern Asia, northeast Australia)
 Elaeagnus tubiflora C.Y.Chang (China)
 Elaeagnus tutcheri Dunn (southern China)
 Elaeagnus umbellata Thunb. – Japanese silverberry or autumn olive (eastern Asia)
 Elaeagnus viridis Servett. (China)
 Elaeagnus wenshanensis C.Y.Chang (China)
 Elaeagnus wilsonii H.L.Li (China)
 Elaeagnus wushanensis C.Y.Chang (China)
 Elaeagnus xichouensis C.Y.Chang (China)
 Elaeagnus xingwenensis C.Y.Chang
 Elaeagnus xizangensis C.Y.Chang (China)
 Elaeagnus yoshinoi Makino
 Elaeagnus yunnanensis Servett.

Species names with uncertain taxonomic status
The status of the following species is unresolved:

 Elaeagnus arakiana Koidz.
 Elaeagnus asakawana Sa.Kurata
 Elaeagnus attenuata Nakai
 Elaeagnus crocea Nakai
 Elaeagnus cyanea Aiton ex Steud.
 Elaeagnus emarginata Colla
 Elaeagnus fasciculata (Wall. ex Steud.) A.Nelson
 Elaeagnus fragrans Nakai
 Elaeagnus fruticosa (Lour.) A.Chev.
 Elaeagnus fusca Pépin ex Lem.
 Elaeagnus higoensis Nakai
 Elaeagnus kiusiana Nakai
 Elaeagnus laetevirens Lindb.
 Elaeagnus latifolia Lour.
 Elaeagnus mayeharai Nakai
 Elaeagnus nagasakiana Nakai
 Elaeagnus numajiriana Makino
 Elaeagnus oleaster L.
 Elaeagnus pauciflora C.Y. Chang (China)
 Elaeagnus philippinensis Perrott. – lingaro berry (Philippines)
 Elaeagnus × pyramidalis Browicz & Bugala (E. commutata × E. multiflora)
 Elaeagnus oxycarpa Schltdl. (China)
 Elaeagnus rotundifolia (Parry) A.Nelson
 Elaeagnus sativa Dippel
 Elaeagnus undulata auct.
 Elaeagnus utilis A.Nelson
 Elaeagnus veteris-castelli Lepage
 Elaeagnus yakusimensis Masam.

Hybrids 
The following hybrids have been described:
 Elaeagnus × maritima Koidz.
 Elaeagnus × reflexa E.Morren & Decne. (E. pungens × E. glabra)
 Elaeagnus × submacrophylla Servett. (E. macrophylla × E. pungens)

Habitat 
The vast majority of the species are native to temperate and subtropical regions of Asia.  Elaeagnus triflora extends from Asia south into northeastern Australia, while E. commutata is native to North America, and Elaeagnus philippinensis is native to the Philippines. One of the Asian species, E. angustifolia, may also be native in southeasternmost Europe, though it may instead be an early human introduction there.  Also, several Asiatic species of Elaeagnus have become established as introduced species in North America, with some of these species being considered invasive, or even designated as noxious, in portions of the United States.

Ecology 
Elaeagnus species are used as food plants by the larvae of some Lepidoptera species including Coleophora elaeagnisella and the Gothic moths. The thorny shrubs can also provide good nesting sites for birds.

Nitrogen fixation 
Many Elaeagnus species harbor nitrogen-fixing organisms in their roots, so are able to grow well in low-nitrogen soils. This ability results in multiple ecological consequences where these Elaeagnus species are present. They can become invasive in many locations where they are established as exotic species. Two species (E. pungens and E. umbellata) are currently rated as category II noxious, invasive species in many world regions and by the Florida Exotic Pest Plant Council.

Cultivation 
Elaeagnus species are widely cultivated for their showy, often variegated, foliage, and numerous cultivars and hybrids have been developed.

The fruit is acid and somewhat astringent. It makes good tarts.

Notable species and hybrids in cultivation include:-
Elaeagnus angustifolia
Elaeagnus commutata
Elaeagnus macrophylla
Elaeagnus multiflora
Elaeagnus pungens
Elaeagnus × reflexa
Elaeagnus × submacrophylla (syn. E. × ebbingei)
Elaeagnus umbellata

The hybrid Elaeagnus × submacrophylla and the cultivar 'Gilt Edge' have gained the Royal Horticultural Society's Award of Garden Merit.

References

External links 

eFloras Chinese Plant list: Elaeagnus

 
Rosales genera